Phalangium opilio (also known as the Common harvestman and daddy longlegs) is a species of harvestman belonging to the family Phalangiidae.

Taxonomy

P. opilio is a member of the Eupnoi suborder of Opiliones.

Distribution
P. opilio has a mostly holarctic distribution and is the most widespread harvestman species worldwide, occurring natively in Europe, North and Central Asia, and Asia Minor. The species has been introduced to North America, North Africa and New Zealand from Europe. In North America, it occurs in non-desert regions of southern Canada and the United States.

Habitat
This species can be found in a wide range of open habitats, including meadows, bogs, and forests. It is also most abundant in anthropogenic habitats, and is thus considered a synanthropic species of harvestmen. In can be found in habitats modified by humans, such as gardens, agroecosystems, hedgerows, lawns, quarries, urban green spaces, walls and bridges. In agricultural settings, P. opilio is common in temperate cropland, living among crops such as corn, alfalfa, small grains, potatoes, cabbage, strawberries, and apple.

P. opilio apparently prefer vertical surfaces, including tree trunks and vertical man-made structures like fences and walls, with a preference for wood substrate due to its low thermal conductivity and slow release of moisture, being a thermophilous and moderately hygrophilous species. However, their preference varies based on the amount of cover available in a certain area. P. opilio tend to be found in shrubs and brushy vegetation when sparse shrub cover exists, but tend to be found on the ground layer when dense cover is present, such as low vegetation and grass. Early instars, immature P. opilio, only occur on the ground, but later instars have a broader vertical range. P. opilio have also been observed to take cover in low vegetation, like grass, during rain.

Description
Like other harvestmen, P. opilio have long, slender legs and a short, round body. Males tend to have smaller bodies than females. Both sexes are similarly coloured and are marked light brown and gray, often with a light cream underside.

P. opilio is relatively large compared to other harvestmen species. Individuals of both sexes have very long pedipalps, and their legs, bodies, and eye tubercles are covered with spines. Males can be differentiated from females by their longer pedipalps and the existence of long, forward-pointing processes, appearing similar to horns, on the second segment of their chelicerae. In some European populations, P. opilio male chelicerae and pedipalpal size have significant allometric variation, but it's not clear whether this is continuous or discrete, which would indicate male dimorphism in P. opilio.

As an arachnid species, P. opilio have four pairs of legs. Three of these pairs are for movement, but the longest, second pair is antennae-shaped and used as a sensory appendage to feel their surroundings. Their tarsus, the segment of their legs furthest from their body, have numerous pseudosegments called tarsomeres that make them prehensile, enabling P. opilio to use them in climbing, such as by curling them around twigs; courtship of mates; and male—male combat. Their legs have seven segments, whereas pedipalps have six.

Juveniles

Immature P. opilio resemble adults, but have shorter legs relative to their bodies and are smaller overall.

Eggs

P. opilio'''s eggs are smooth, spherical in shape, and about 0.4 mm in diameter, laid in clusters ranging from ten to several hundred. As they mature, their color changes from off-white to dark grey-brown. Clutches consist of about 250 eggs in total with embryos that develop at the same time. Each egg has a thin, opaque chorion membrane and a thick, transparent vitelline membrane.

Similar speciesMitopus morio has a very similar appearance, but P. opilio can be distinguished by the two pale "denticles" (small teeth-like structures) below the anterior margin of the carapace, as well as the long forward-pointing "horns" on the second segment of male P. opilio's chelicerae.

Behavior

Most of their time is spent stationary, but P. opilio have also been observed walking and leg palpating—making tapping movements with their sensory legs—as well as drinking, feeding, and grooming. As is typical of opilionids, the species is nocturnal, observed to exhibit 90% of their total activity between 18:00 and 06:00. Adults of both sexes have been observed to walk more from nightfall to midnight than during the day, and males have been observed to walk for longer in the early morning, until 03:00, possibly to attempt to find females to mate with. P. opilio also exhibit leg palpating only at night, with adult females and nymphs exhibiting more leg palpating than males, possibly as a foraging strategy.

DietP. opilio is a generalist predator and scavenger that feeds on soft-bodied animals found in crops, such as aphids, caterpillars, leafhoppers, beetle larvae, and mites. Sometimes it may also scavenge on hard-bodied animals, such as various arthropods, including other harvestmen.

They are also known to feed on Helicoverpa zea eggs among soybean crops.

Life cycle

Eggs are laid in moist areas and hatch in three to five months. The juveniles undergo several molts and reach maturity in two to three months. Phalangium opilio is a univoltine species in Europe, producing one generation per year that overwinters as eggs. Two or more generations may occur within a year in some areas of North America, in which case eggs, immatures, and adults may all overwinter. For example, in Central Europe, one generation matures per year in early summer and late autumn. On the other hand, in Kentucky, they apparently undergo three generations per year, overwintering in the egg stage.

Reproduction

Like other harvestman species, male and female P. opilio copulate with multiple partners to achieve internal fertilization, and males produce aflagellate sperm. The mating season of P. opilio is three months long, as examined in the cold humid "Dfb" climate subcategory of the Köppen–Geiger map.

When introduced to each other in a laboratory setting, male and female individuals mate within few seconds of contact. Female specimens laid one clutch about every three days, producing colonies that overwintered and yielded new adult females that bred and laid eggs in winter. The adult lifespan is 40 to 60 days long.

Microhabitat separation and migration
When observed in small, fenced-in areas of soybean fields, P. opilio nymphs of different sizes and adults of different sexes inhabited different vertical levels, moving between the ground and the bottom, middle, and top of plants at different times of the day. At nightfall (21:00), medium-sized nymphs tend to remain on plants at night, whereas larger nymphs and adults of both sexes move to the ground. A theory for this behavior is that medium-sized nymphs stay in vegetation at night to avoid higher predation risk from nocturnal ground predators and other P. opilio. Adult males tend to remain on the ground by 03:00, spending more time there than females and large nymphs that return to the plants by then. At 03:00, a substantial portion of female adults migrated to the top portion of the plants. The same happened with the males at 06:00, three hours later.

Biology

"Daddy shortlegs"

On August 4, 2021, a journal article was published by Guilherme Gainett et al. regarding their assembly of the first draft genome of P. opilio, created from a colony established from specimens collected in Madison, Wisconsin—the first draft genome ever assembled for a harvestman species. Guilherme Gainett et al. identified and examined the function of the genes Deformed (Dfd) and Sex combs reduced (Scr). These genes are also known as Hox genes, which control development in regions along an embryo's head-tail axis. Knockdown of the Dfd gene, preventing it from being expressed, led to the first two of P. opilio embryos' leg pairs transforming into pedipalps, a transformation known as homeosis, and their sensory leg pair becoming significantly shorter. Knockdown of both Dfd and Scr led to this homeotic transformation occurring in the first three pairs of legs. Knockdown of another gene, Epidermal growth factor receptor (Egfr) also caused shortened legs and the loss of tarsomeres. The resulting specimens with shortened legs have also been referred to as "daddy shortlegs", derived from the colloquial species name "daddy longlegs".

Embryonic development

In 2022, an embryogenesis staging system, a list and description of stages of embryonic development, was presented for P. opilio by Guilherme Gainett et al. This was the first embryonic staging developed for a species of the order Opiliones, and used as a reference the P. opilio embryo descriptions by Manfred Moritz and Dietrich Winkler, as well as the embryonic staging that they had based their descriptions on, developed by Christian Juberthie for the species Odiellus gallicus, another species of the Phalangiidae family.

Relationship to humans

Research

Due to its broad, synanthropic distribution, P. opilio is considered an opportune representative of the order Opiliones. As such, it is actively used to study its embryonic development to examine arachnid development and evolution.

Biological pest control in agricultureP. opilio feeds on many insect species considered pests, such that it can provide biological pest control in agricultural settings. It isn't solely able to supress any populations of a pest species, but its existence alongside other generalist predators contributes overall to controlling pest populations. Their value to human agriculture varies due to their generalist feeding habits and consumption of other members of its species, but this may in turn allow their populations to persist even when pest density is low, enabling them to suppress earlier stages of pest outbreaks when they do occur.

For example, since P. opilio preys on the eggs of Helicoverpa zea, a major agricultural pest, it can act as biological pest control for soybean crops. They particularly benefit the seasonal timing of soybean production in Kentucky because their second annual generation occurs in time for them to feed on H. zea eggs.P. opilio is highly susceptible to some broad spectrum insecticides, so use of such insecticides is discouraged for conservation of P. opilio populations. Some specific products appear to cause less harm to P. opilio'', such as Bts.

Gallery

References

Harvestmen
Animals described in 1758
Arachnids of Africa
Arachnids of Asia
Arachnids of Europe
Arachnids of New Zealand
Arachnids of North America
Taxa named by Carl Linnaeus